Adarnase II, sometimes known as Adarnase I, was a Georgian Bagratid prince and a co-ruler of Tao-Klarjeti with his brothers — Bagrat I Kuropalates and Guaram Mampali — with the title of eristavt-eristavi ("duke of dukes") (830-c. 870).

The name Adarnase derives from Middle Persian Ādurnarsēh, with the second component of the word (Nase) being the Georgian attestation of the Middle Persian name Narseh, which ultimately derives from Avestan nairyō.saŋya-. The Middle Persian name Narseh also exists in Georgian as Nerse. The name Ādurnarsēh appears in the Armenian language as Atrnerseh.

Adarnase was the oldest son of the Georgian presiding prince Ashot I and inherited all the lands west to the Arsiani Range with the exception of Shavsheti and Lower Tao (now in Turkey). 

Adarnase was married to "Bevreli", a daughter of the Abasgian king Bagrat I. At some point, she was forced by Adarnase into retirement to a monastery where she lived and died as Anastasia. After Adarnase's death c. 870, his possessions were equally divided among his sons: Gurgen obtained Tao, while Sumbat received Klarjeti. Adarnase's second son Ashot the Beautiful, died in 867. This must have occurred in Adarnase's lifetime as Ashot is not listed among his heirs.

References 

Grand dukes of Tao
9th-century rulers in Europe
9th-century people from Georgia (country)
Bagrationi dynasty of Tao-Klarjeti